Michael Frederick Bull (3 April 1930 – December 2011) was an English professional footballer who played in the Football League for Brentford and Swindon Town as an outside forward. He later had a career in non-League football, most notably with Bedford Town.

Club career

Brentford 
An outside forward, Bull began his career at Second Division club Brentford in September 1948, but had to wait until 1953 to make his first team debut for the club. His only appearances for the club came in three matches in February 1953, against Everton, Bury and Doncaster Rovers. Bull was released at the end of the 1952–53 season.

Swindon Town 
Bull joined Third Division South club Swindon Town in June 1953 and had a good first season with the struggling team, making 43 appearances, scoring 12 goals and finishing as the club's top scorer. His form deserted him during the 1954–55 season and he scored just three goals in 29 appearances, before departing at the end of the campaign. Bull made 72 appearances and scored 15 goals for the Robins.

Non-League football 
After his release from Swindon, Bull dropped into non-League football and played for Hastings United, Tonbridge, Tunbridge Wells United and Chatham Town. A memorable spell came with Southern League club Bedford Town, for whom he scored 51 goals in 189 appearances. He finished his time with the club by winning the South East Division title in the 1958–59 season.

Career statistics

Honours 
Bedford Town
 Southern League South East Division: 1958–59

References

1930 births
2011 deaths
Footballers from Twickenham
Association football outside forwards
English footballers
Brentford F.C. players
Swindon Town F.C. players
Hastings United F.C. (1948) players
Bedford Town F.C. players
Tonbridge Angels F.C. players
Tunbridge Wells F.C. players
Chatham Town F.C. players
English Football League players
Southern Football League players